Thomas Vilhelm Pedersen (28 January 1820 – 13 March 1859) was a Danish painter and illustrator who is known for his illustrations for fairy tales of Hans Christian Andersen. He was the first artist to illustrate Andersen's works. His drawings were converted into wood prints and used in the Danish and German editions.

Biography
Pedersen was born in Karlslunde. He initially followed in his father's footsteps and became an officer in the Royal Danish Navy. He was interested in drawing and in 1843 Christian VIII granted him four years' paid leave to enable him to pursuit an artistic career. He studied with Wilhelm Marstrand and enrolled at the Royal Danish Academy of Fine Arts. He first exhibited his works 1847 but voluntarily returned to the army at the outbreak of the Three Year War. He participated in the Battle of Eckernförde, which he would later depict in two paintings. He then continued his interrupted naval career until his early death in 1859.

Private life

References

External links

 
 Illustrations by Vilhelm Pedersen and Lorenz Frølich at a Hans Christian Andersen website (visithcandersen.dk)
Ask Art: Vilhelm Pedersen 
The Stories of Hans Christian Andersen at Google Books
Weilbach, Ph. (1898) "Pedersen, Thomas Vilhelm" in Carl Frederik Bricka (ed.) Dansk biografisk Lexikon / XII. Bind. Münch – Peirup . Copenhagen: Gyldendalske Boghandels Forlag, pp. 641–62.
 

19th-century Danish illustrators
Danish children's book illustrators
19th-century illustrators of fairy tales
Danish painters
People from Greve Municipality
1820 births
1859 deaths